The Bowman 42 is an ocean-cruising yacht produced by Rustler Yachts of Falmouth. The yacht is traditionally lined and styled, but is built from solid glassfibre composite with a fin and skeg underwater profile.

To achieve a good seakeeping ability for ocean cruising, the yacht is heavily constructed, and well ballasted. In addition, the yacht incorporates a strong skeg hung rudder. The production of the yachts on a semi-custom basis, and the small numbers of yachts produced each year, result in a significantly higher purchase cost than comparable yachts from mass-production companies. The yacht is available in various degrees of part-completion as well as in factory finished form.

See also
Bowman Yachts
Bowman 45
Bowman 48
Rustler 42
Rustler 44

References

External links
Bowman Yachts
Bowman 42

Sailing yachts
1990s sailboat type designs